Ljubiša Samardžić (19 November 1936 – 8 September 2017), nicknamed Smoki, was a Serbian actor and director, best known as Šurda in the Vruć vetar TV series, and Inspector Boško Simić in the comedy crime series Policajac sa Petlovog brda (The Policeman from Petlovo Brdo) and film of the same name.

Early life
Samardžić was born in Skopje, the son of an impoverished coal miner born in Krivošije (in Montenegro) and a mother from Kosovo. His parents met in Priština. He grew up in the village of Jelašnica near Niška Banja, where his father Dragoljub (died 1948) also worked in the local mine. He finished gymnasium in Niš.

His acting talent was discovered very early and he won a scholarship with director Bojan Stupica. Samardžić was educated at the Belgrade Academy of Arts. After graduation, he obtained a role in Igre na skelama (1961).

Samardžić was a member of the Central Committee of League of Communists of Yugoslavia in late 1980s.

Career
In the 1960s, he established himself as one of the most recognisable and popular stars of former Yugoslav cinema.

He was married to Mirjana Samardžić since 1966. Nicknamed Smoki, he was credited as Ljubisa Samardjic, Luba Samardy, Ljubisa Samardzic-Smoki, and Smoki Samardì. 

In the 1990s, he and his son, Dragan, founded a film production company. Despite the break-up of Yugoslavia and UN sanctions against Yugoslavia, the company made many popular and commercial successful films. He starred in over 180 films.

Awards

Samardžić received six Golden Arenas at the Pula Film Festival, and numerous awards at Italian film festivals. As a director, his movies were awarded with the Grand Prix at Montpellier, the Public Award at Palm Springs, and Opera Prima at the Milan Film Festival. In August 1995, he received Life Achievement Award "Pavle Vujisić" for his roles in Yugoslav cinematography.

Selected filmography

Actor

 Igre na skelama (1961) - Gvardijan
 Kozara (1962) - Mitar
 Prekobrojna (1962) - Mikajlo
 Pesceni grad (1962) - Smoki
 Dani (1963) - Dragan
 Desant na Drvar (1963) - Milan
 Lito vilovito (1964) - Vice
 Devojka (1965) - Vojnik 
 Inspektor (1965) - Borivoje Jovanovic
  (1965) - Abdul
 Orlovi rano lete (1966) - Nikoletina Bursac
 The Climber (1966) - Ivan Stojanovic
 The Dream (1966) - Mali
 Noz (1967) - Markov pomocnik
 Jutro (1967) - Mali
 Bokseri idu u raj (1967) - Reum
 Diverzanti (1967) - Sarac
 Sirota Marija (1968) - Vojislav
 U raskoraku (1968)
 Podne (1968) - Ljubisa
 Goli covjek (1968) - Spiro
 Operacija Beograd (1968) - Jasa (voice, uncredited)
 Battle of Neretva (1969) - Novak
 Ubistvo na svirep i podmukao nacin i iz niskih pobuda (1969) - Himself (uncredited)
 X + YY: Formel des Bösen (1970)
 Siroma' sam al' sam besan (1970) - Sava Kekic
 Biciklisti (1970) - Vitomir
 Zarki (1970)
 In Love, Every Pleasure Has Its Pain (1971) - Zilio
 Walter Defends Sarajevo (1972) - Zis
 Deveto cudo na istoku (1972) - Tomislav Brodarac
 Battle of Sutjeska (1973) - Stanojlo ... topdzija s konjem
 Bombasi (1973) - Kovac
 A Performance of Hamlet in the Village of Mrdusa Donja (1974) - Macak
 Hajdúk (1975)
 Cudoviti prah (1975)
 Doktor Mladen (1975) - Stanisa
 Crvena zemlja (1975) - Kosta
 Naivko (1975) - Buzga Mirocki
 Bele trave (1976)
 Special Education (1977) - Milicioner Cane
 Ljubavni zivot Budimira Trajkovica (1977) - Vojislav Voja Trajkovic
 Lude godine (1977) - Dr. Lazovic
 Tamo i natrag (1978) - Sava
 Stici pre svitanja (1978) - Kosta
 Bosko Buha (1978) - Milun
 The Tiger (1978) - Sorga 'Tigar'
 Partizanska eskadrila (1979) - Zare
 Vruć vetar (1980, TV Series) - Borivoje Surdilovic 'Surda'
 Avanture Borivoja Surdilovica (1980) - Borivoje Surdilovic - Surda
 Neka druga zena (1981) - Gvozden
 Visoki napon (1981) - Ivo Goreta
 Siroko je lisce (1981) - Marko
 Gosti iz galaksije (1981) - Toni
 Kraljevski voz (1981) - Tole
 Dvije polovine srca (1982) - Otac
 Smrt gospodina Goluze (1982) - Goluza
 Savamala (1982) - Lampas
 Moj tata na odredjeno vreme (1982) - Sinisa Pantic
 Medeni mjesec (1983) - Rajko
 Timocka buna (1983) - Lazar ... ucitelj
 Secerna vodica (1983) - Fotograf
 Maturanti (Pazi sta radis) (1984) - Profesor Plavsic
 Jaguarov skok (1984) - Bogdan
 Orkestar jedne mladosti (1985)
 Nije lako sa muskarcima (1985) - Ivan Sekulovic
 Zivot je lep (1985) - Valentino, kelner
 Anticasanova (1985) - Stipe
 Dancing in Water (1985) - Glenn's father
 Protestni album (1986) - Pasa
 Razvod na odredjeno vreme (1986) - Sinisa Pantic
 Dobrovoljci (1986) - Kelner
 Andjeo cuvar (1987) - Dragan
 Na putu za Katangu (1987) - Tosa Palidrvce
 Lager Nis (1987) - Kole Kockar
 Zivela svoboda! (1987) - Komandant
 Vanbracna putovanja (1988) - Kapetan Tadic
 Kuca pored pruge (1988) - Stanisa
  (1989) - Postar Djoka
 Poltron (1989) - Miodrag Krtalic
 Seobe II (1989) - Trifun Isakovic
 Uros blesavi (1989) - Uros
 Noc u kuci moje majke (1991) - Sreten
 Mala (1991) - Zika Ajkula
 Policajac sa Petlovog brda' (1992) - Bosko Simic
 Three Tickets to Hollywood (1993) - Limijer
 Kazi zasto me ostavi (1993) - Rade
 Magarece godine (1994) - Jovo 'Skandal'
 Premeditated Murder (1995) - Vidosav
 Jugofilm (1997) - Bora
 Strsljen (1998) - Profesor Lane Sekularac
 Tockovi (1998) - Vlasnik hotela
 Blues za Saro (1998) - Milivoj
 Natasa (2001) - Tosa (Natasin otac)
 Viza za budućnost (2002-2008, TV Series) - Milan Golijanin
 Yu (2003)
  (2004) - Marijin otac
 Konji vrani (2007) - Deda
 Bledi mesec (2008) - Deda

Director
 Sky Hook (2000)
 Natasha (2001)
 Ledina (2003)
 Goose Feather (2004)
 Black Horses (2007)
 Pale Moon (2008)
 The Scent of Rain in the Balkans'' (2011)

References

External links

1936 births
2017 deaths
Serbian male actors
Serbian film directors
Golden Arena winners
Volpi Cup for Best Actor winners
Yugoslav male actors
Yugoslav film directors
Actors from Niš
20th-century Serbian people
Serbian people of Montenegrin descent